Bakkesvodene Crags are high rock crags overlooking the east side of Lunde Glacier in the Muhlig-Hofmann Mountains, Queen Maud Land. They were plotted from surveys and from air photos by the Norwegian Antarctic Expedition (1956–60) and named "Bakkesvodene" (the "hill slopes").

References
 

Cliffs of Queen Maud Land
Princess Astrid Coast